Revolutions is the debut album by Finnish rock band Blind Channel. The album was released on 1 October 2016, with recording starting in October 2015 with the help of Jonas Olsson, and ended a year later. The album consists of 11 songs, one of which is the cover of the song "Don't" by Ed Sheeran. The album received generally positive reviews, with Finnish publications such as Soundi and KaaosZine giving it high praise, among other review sources.

Singles 
The first single from the album, "Unforgiving", was released on 12 June 2015, and later re-recorded and added to the album's tracklist. On 29 September of the same year, Blind Channel released a cover of the Ed Sheeran song "Don't", which was played on radio stations not only in Finland, but abroad as well.

On 19 February 2016, the single "Darker Than Black" was released. The music video, produced with the support of Ranka Kustannus, was issueed on the same day. On 22 June of the same year, the band released the single "Deja Fu", as well as the music video for the song. The video was filmed by Teemu Halmetoja, and the video itself was a selection from the group's performances at festivals and concerts in 2016. The last single "Enemy for Me" was released shortly before the album's release on 16 September 2016.

Track listing

Personnel 
 Joel Hokka – vocals
 Niko Moilanen – vocals
 Joonas Porko – guitar, backing vocals
 Olli Matela – bass guitar
 Tommi Lalli – drums

Charts

References 

2016 debut albums
Blind Channel albums
Rock albums by Finnish artists